Axel Elof Bertil Johansson (19 March 1929 – 15 November 2005) was a Swedish footballer who played for Uddevalla. He featured once for the Sweden national football team in 1952.

Career statistics

Club

Notes

International

References

1929 births
2005 deaths
Sportspeople from Helsingborg
Swedish footballers
Sweden international footballers
Association football midfielders